Alex G. Tse is a United States magistrate judge of the United States District Court for the Northern District of California and was formerly the acting United States Attorney for the Northern District of California from 2018 to 2019.

Education and legal career 

Tse is a graduate of University of California, Berkeley. He went to law school at University of California, Hastings College of the Law.

Prior to becoming acting US Attorney, Tse was a longtime federal prosecutor who worked in the City Attorney of San Francisco's office. He replaced the previous US Attorney, Brian Stretch, in January 2018.

He served as acting attorney after the resignation of Brian Stretch, and he was succeeded by David L. Anderson.

Federal judicial service

United States magistrate judge service 
Tse was selected in 2019 to become a United States magistrate judge for the United States District Court for the Northern District of California; he filled the seat left vacant by Judge Elizabeth Laporte who retired on October 25, 2019 and was sworn in on January 28, 2020.

See also
List of Asian American jurists

References

Lawyers who have represented the United States government
Living people
United States Attorneys for the Northern District of California
University of California, Berkeley alumni
University of California, Hastings College of the Law alumni
Year of birth missing (living people)
United States magistrate judges
21st-century American judges
Assistant United States Attorneys